West Funk (1841 – July 29, 1897) was an American soldier who received the Medal of Honor for valor during the American Civil War.

Biography
Funk enlisted in the 121st Pennsylvania in September 1862, and was mustered out with the rest of his regiment in June 1865. He was awarded the Medal of Honor on October 15, 1872 for his actions at the Battle of Appomattox Court House.

Medal of Honor citation
Citation:

The President of the United States of America, in the name of Congress, takes pleasure in presenting the Medal of Honor to Major West Funk, United States Army, for extraordinary heroism on 9 April 1865, while serving with 121st Pennsylvania Infantry, in action at Appomattox Courthouse, Virginia, for capture of flag of 46th Virginia Infantry (Confederate States of America).

See also

List of American Civil War Medal of Honor recipients: A-F

References

External links
Military Times

1841 births
1897 deaths
Union Army soldiers
United States Army Medal of Honor recipients
People from Boston
People of Pennsylvania in the American Civil War
American Civil War recipients of the Medal of Honor